Wellsburg is a village in Chemung County, New York, United States. The population was 580 at the 2010 census. The village is named after the pioneer family of Abner Wells (1737–1797) who came from Southold on Long Island.

Wellsburg is located in the southeast part of the town of Ashland. It is southeast of the city of Elmira and is part of the Elmira Metropolitan Statistical Area.

History 
The area was settled around 1788. The village was incorporated in 1872.

Christ Episcopal Church was listed on the National Register of Historic Places in 2000.

In the 1930s, there were also a Methodist and a Baptist church. The village contained two bars, two grocery stores (Aber and Stanton), Dalton's meat market, two gas stations, a "creamery", an Erie Railroad depot, Dalton's coal yard, a deteriorated Hotel Alcazar, a post office, and Schuyler's Feed, Grain & Lumber Yard. A four-story school served grades 1–12, with a small playground and a ballfield. Some students were bussed in from surrounding areas. One day in 1939, an "autogyro" landed on that ballfield and remained a short time. Wellsburg had a mayor and a constable; the latter being rather "adept" at catching those who overturned outhouses during Halloween.

Occasionally the Chemung River would overflow, usually flooding the short road between Wellsburg and Lowman, but it once flooded Wellsburg to the extent that rowboats could enter the Methodist church. Local farmers hired kids to do farm chores, usually at $0.50 per-day. Youngsters driving tractors into town (for gas) were a familiar sight. During the WWII years, students aged 14 and up were allowed days off from school to help local farmers harvest their crops. There was also an "airplane spotter's shack" on the side of a hill, during the war; teens often served as "spotters".

Geography
Wellsburg is located in southern Chemung County at  (42.011211, -76.727753).

Wellsburg is on the south bank of the Chemung River, a tributary of the Susquehanna River, and is adjacent to the Pennsylvania border. Bentley Creek flows northward through the village to the Chemung River and was a power source to early pioneers.

NY-367 (Main Street) intersects NY-427 in the village. County Road 8 enters the village from the north.

Demographics

As of the census of 2000, there were 631 people, 243 households, and 164 families residing in the village. The population density was 1,107.0 people per square mile (427.4/km2). There were 261 housing units at an average density of 457.9 per square mile (176.8/km2). The racial makeup of the village was 98.73% White, 0.32% African American, and 0.95% from two or more races. Hispanic or Latino of any race were 0.48% of the population.

There were 243 households, out of which 32.5% had children under the age of 18 living with them, 51.4% were married couples living together, 7.0% had a female householder with no husband present, and 32.1% were non-families. 27.2% of all households were made up of individuals, and 15.6% had someone living alone who was 65 years of age or older. The average household size was 2.56 and the average family size was 3.10.

In the village, the population was spread out, with 27.6% under the age of 18, 7.3% from 18 to 24, 26.1% from 25 to 44, 22.0% from 45 to 64, and 17.0% who were 65 years of age or older. The median age was 38 years. For every 100 females, there were 101.0 males. For every 100 females age 18 and over, there were 98.7 males.

The median income for a household in the village was $34,135, and the median income for a family was $40,750. Males had a median income of $30,000 versus $18,594 for females. The per capita income for the village was $17,426. About 10.9% of families and 13.7% of the population were below the poverty line, including 16.1% of those under age 18 and 4.0% of those age 65 or over.

References

External links

 Village of Wellsburg official website
 Tri-Counties Genealogy & History: Town of Ashland & Village of Wellsburg, Chemung County NY

Villages in New York (state)
Villages in Chemung County, New York